Coleville may refer to:

 Coleville, Saskatchewan
 Coleville, California
 Coleville, Missouri

See also
 Colleville (disambiguation)
 Colville (disambiguation)
 Coalville (disambiguation)
 Colvile (disambiguation)